Spectra Communications Group, LLC is a U.S. telephone operating company owned by CenturyLink that provides local telephone service in Missouri.

History
Spectra Communications Group was established in 1999 upon Spectra's purchase of 170 GTE Midwest exchanges from GTE. The company was formed by Atlanta, Georgia-based Spectronics Corporation which became the first African-American owned company to control a US telecommunications company. CenturyTel had a significant investment in the telephone company, which it now owns.

Proposed sale
On August 3, 2021, Lumen announced its sale of its local telephone assets in 20 states to Apollo Global Management, including Missouri.

Service area
The company provides telephone service in all of the area codes in Missouri with the exception of Area code 314 and Area code 636.

References

See also
GTE Midwest
GTE
CenturyLink

American companies established in 1999
Lumen Technologies
Communications in Missouri